The Saturn V is a type of multi-stage rocket used in the Apollo moon missions.

Saturn V can also refer to:

 Rhea, a moon designated Saturn V
 An alternative designation for the Centaur rocket stage
 "Saturn 5", a song on the Inspiral Carpets album Devil Hopping